The congresses of the federal entities of Mexico are the depositary bodies of the legislative power in the thirty-one states and Mexico City. Conformed as unicameral assemblies, they are composed of deputies elected under the principles of relative majority and by proportional representation, in accordance with the specific regulations of local laws, but following the general bases of the federal constitution. All states, including Mexico City, use the presidential system form of government.

Its members are elected by universal vote under the two principles already mentioned; the former directly and the others according to the multi-member list system established by federal law. The term of office is three years with the option of immediate reelection, as long as it is representing the party or coalition that originally nominated the deputy.

For each titular deputy, an alternate is elected; This being the one who will make up for the temporary or permanent absences of his running mate. Its characteristics and general bases are supported by section II of article 116 of the Political Constitution of the United Mexican States.

The legislative powers and capacities of these institutions are framed in those policies in which the states are autonomous (internal regime, budget, income, social development, public security, prosecution and administration of justice) that are not contemplated in the federal order and that are not exclusively awarded to the Congress of the Union, so that each state has their own legislature whereby laws affecting the state are made.

List of congresses

Composition by political parties

See also 
 List of Mexican state governors
 State governments of Mexico
 List of political parties in Mexico

References

External links 
 Directory of state congresses

Legislatures of Mexican states
state congresses